Marco Tulio may refer to:

 Marcos Rogério (politician) (born 1978), Brazilian politician
 Marcos Rogério (footballer) (born 1985), Brazilian footballer